Thomas Edward Bridges, 2nd Baron Bridges,  (27 November 1927 – 27 May 2017)  was a  British hereditary peer and diplomat.

Early life
Bridges was born on 27 November 1927 to Edward Bridges, later Cabinet Secretary. His grandfather was Robert Bridges, the Poet Laureate. He was educated at Eton College and New College, Oxford.

Career
He joined the Diplomatic Service in 1951. Following postings to, amongst other places, West Berlin, Rio de Janeiro, Moscow and Washington, D.C., he was HM Ambassador to Italy from 1983 to 1987.

He sat as a crossbench member of the House of Lords from 1975, and was one of the ninety hereditary peers elected to remain under the House of Lords Act 1999 He was on  leave of absence from March 2011 to May 2015. Having failed to attend during the whole of the 2015–16 session without being on leave of absence, he ceased to be a member on 18 May 2016 pursuant to section 2 of the House of Lords Reform Act 2014. He died a year later on 27 May 2017 at the age of 89.

Personal life
Bridges was married to Rachel Mary Bunbury (1926–2005), youngest daughter of Sir Henry Noel Bunbury . They had three children:

 Mark Bridges, 3rd Baron Bridges  (b. 1954), Private Solicitor to the Queen
 Nicholas Edward Bridges (b. 1956), an architect
 Harriet Elizabeth Bridges

The Conservative peer The Lord Bridges of Headley is his nephew.

Honours
In 1969, Bridges succeeded to the barony of Bridges upon the death of his father. In the 1975 New Year Honours, he was appointed to the Order of St Michael and St George as a Companion (CMG). In the 1983 New Year Honours, Bridges was promoted within the same Order as a Knight Commander (KCMG). In the 1988 New Year Honours, Bridges was promoted within the same Order as a Knight Grand Cross (GCMG).

References

1927 births
2017 deaths
People educated at Eton College
2
Crossbench hereditary peers
Knights Grand Cross of the Order of St Michael and St George
Ambassadors of the United Kingdom to Italy
Diplomatic peers
Alumni of New College, Oxford
Members of HM Diplomatic Service
20th-century British diplomats
Hereditary peers elected under the House of Lords Act 1999